Zvezdana Popović, a scientific researcher, was a member of the Founding Committee of the Democratic Party, the first non-communist opposition party in Serbia, from late December 1989.

References

:File:The founding committee of the Democratic party in Serbia.pdf

Year of birth missing
Possibly living people
Serbian political people
Serbian scientists